Baomianqian Township is a township in Shaodong, Hunan, China. The population was 11,756 at the 2017 census.

History
It was known as Anhe Township in 1950. In 1956 its named was changed to "Baomianqian Township". In 1961 it was renamed "Baomianqian People's Commune". In 1984 it was restored as a township.

Administrative division
As of 2015, the township is divided into nineteen villages: 
Shamuyuan  
Dayang  
Hongjing  
Huajia  
Aizhu  
Xinyuan  
Wuyi  
Jinshi  
Xinhua  
Chayun  
Bayi  
Baomianqian  
Dayun  
Leiwan  
Hengjiachong  
Shuanglian  
Shengli  
Yonggui  
Caoyuanchong

Geography

Economy
Baomianqian Township's economy is based on nearby mineral resources and agricultural resources. Sweet potato and wheat are the main food crops. Chinese herbal medicine is the main economic crop. It is rich in iron, aluminum, gold, copper, uranium, manganese, phosphorus and granite.

Notable people
Shen Taizhi, Tang dynasty politician.
Luo Zongzhi, Southern Song dynasty politician.
Zou Tongshu, Ming dynasty scholar.
Liu Dapeng, revolutionist.
Liu Shutao, politician in the Republic of China.
Liu Zhongji, politician.
Liu Shuiyu, journalist of Xinhua News Agency.

References

Divisions of Shaodong